Carl-Olaf Homén (born 24 March 1936 Helsinki) is a Swedish-speaking Finnish attorney, sports administrator and a former Finnish defence minister.
He has a really great grandson named Popi Homen. His son Christian Homen was also a grate middle distance runner.

Homén was a talented middle-distance runner and graduated from the University of Delaware in 1960. He was the president of Finnish Olympic Committee 1984–1988, the president of Finnish Amateur Athletic Association 1977–1980 and the president of Finnish Sports Federation 2000–2003. Homén is a member of the Swedish People's Party of Finland and served as the Minister of Defence of Finland from October 1974 to June 1975.

Internationally he is best known as a member of the board of International Association of Athletics Federations IAAF and as a president of the European Athletic Association EAA from 1987 to 1999.

References

1936 births
Politicians from Helsinki
20th-century Finnish lawyers
Swedish People's Party of Finland politicians
Ministers of Defence of Finland
University of Delaware alumni
Delaware Fightin' Blue Hens men's track and field athletes
Athletics (track and field) administrators
Finnish sports executives and administrators
Living people